The May Bumps 1999 were a set of rowing races held at Cambridge University from Wednesday 9 June 1999 to Saturday 12 June 1999. The event was run as a bumps race and was the 108th set of races in the series of May Bumps that have been held annually in mid-June since 1887. In 1999, a total of 172 crews took part (103 men's crews and 69 women's crews), with around 1550 participants in total.

Head of the River crews

  men rowed-over in 1st position, retaining the headship.

  women bumped  to take their 3rd ever Mays headship.

Highest 2nd VIIIs

Links to races in other years

Bumps Charts

Below are the bumps charts for all divisions. The men's bumps charts are on the left, and women's bumps charts on the right. The bumps chart represents the progress of every crew over all four days of the racing. To follow the progress of any particular crew, simply find the crew's name on the left side of the chart and follow the line to the end-of-the-week finishing position on the right of the chart.

Note:  only raced for the last two days

References
 Durack, John; Gilbert, George; Marks, Dr. John (2000). The Bumps: An Account of the Cambridge University Bumping Races 1827-1999 

May Bumps results
May Bumps
May Bumps
May Bumps